The 1932 Western Kentucky State Teachers Hilltoppers football team represented Western Kentucky State Teachers College (now known as Western Kentucky University) during the 1932 college football season. They were coached by Ernest R. Miller and won the SIAA championship.  Fletcher Holeman was the team captain.

Schedule

References

Western Kentucky State Teachers
Western Kentucky Hilltoppers football seasons
Western Kentucky State Teachers Hilltoppers football